"Bombs" is a song recorded by Faithless, released as the first single from their fifth studio album  To All New Arrivals.  It features Harry Collier from Kubb. The single was released as a download on 23 October 2006 and was later released on CD and 12" on 20 November 2006, one week before the release of the album.

Music video
The video to the song shows scenes of everyday life contrasted and combined with footage of war. It was banned by MTV authorities due to its content.

Charts
 #26 UK
 #15 Finland

Track listing

CD
 Bombs (Edit)
 Bombs (Benny Benassi Remix)
 Bombs (X-Press 2's TNT Vocal Mix)

12" (1)
 Bombs (X-Press 2 Remix)
 Bombs (X-Press 2 Dub)

12" (2)
 Bombs (Benny Benassi Remix)
 Bombs (Benny Benassi Dub)

References

FaithlessWeb.com
Faithless / Rollo / Sister Bliss & related artists - Unofficial Discography

External links
Music Video

2006 singles
Faithless songs
2006 songs
Trip hop songs
Bertelsmann Music Group singles
Cheeky Records singles
Music videos directed by Howard Greenhalgh
Songs written by Sister Bliss
Songs written by Rollo Armstrong
Songs written by Maxi Jazz